Chichester Psalms is a ballet made by New York City Ballet ballet master in chief Peter Martins to eponymous music by Leonard Bernstein. The premiere took place 2 June 2004 at the New York State Theater, with performance by the Juilliard Choral Union, costumes designed by Catherine Barinas, and lighting by Mark Stanley.

Original cast
Carla Körbes 
Amar Ramasar

Reviews 

  
NY Times by Anna Kisselgoff, June 4, 2004
NY Times by Jenifer Dunning, April 29, 2005
 
NY Times by Alastair Macaulay, November 26, 2008

Ballets by Peter Martins
Ballets to the music of Leonard Bernstein
2004 ballet premieres
New York City Ballet repertory